Carnival Sunday (Spanish:Domingo de carnaval) is a 1945 Spanish crime film written, directed and produced by Edgar Neville.

Plot 
A greedy moneylender is murdered the same day that the carnival begins in Madrid. A watch seller, who owed a large amount to the old woman, is the main suspect in the crime. His daughter decides to investigate on her own.

Cast
Conchita Montes as Nieves
Fernando Fernán Gómez as Matías
Guillermo Marín as Gonzalo Fonseca
Julia Lajos as Julia
Fernando Aguirre (as Francisco Aguirre)
Carlos Álvarez Segura		
 Manuel Arbó as Emiliano		
Ildefonso Cuadrado (as S. Cuadrado)
Ginés Gallego
Francisco Hernández
Julia Lajos
Mariana Larrabeiti
Jeffra Delionez
Juana Mansó
Manuel Requena
Joaquín Roa as Nemesio
Alicia Romay

References

Bibliography
 Mira, Alberto. The A to Z of Spanish Cinema. Rowman & Littlefield, 2010.

1945 films
1940s Spanish-language films
Spanish black-and-white films
Spain in fiction
Madrid in fiction
Films directed by Edgar Neville
1945 crime films
Spanish crime films
1940s Spanish films